Luka Petrič (born October 10, 1984) is a Slovenian badminton player.

Career highlights

National championships
2005 – men's singles
2006 – men's singles & mixed doubles
2007 – men's singles
2010 – men's singles
2011 – men's singles, men's singles, doubles & mixed doubles
2012 - men's singles & mixed doubles
2013 - mixed doubles

International tournaments

2004
5th on Slovak Open
5th on Europe Cup

2006
1st on Hatzor Israel International
2nd on Romania International
17th on World Championships
17th on European Championships

2007
1st on Syria International
9th on Bitburger Open
17th on US Open
 Petric played the 2007 BWF World Championships in men's singles, and was defeated in the first round by Pablo Abián, of Spain, 21–9, 29–27.

2009
3rd on Croatian International
3rd on Slovenia International

2011
3rd on Victor Slovak Open 2011

References

External links
Luka Petrič Official Website
Luka Petrič on Facebook
 Luka Petrič on Tweeter

1984 births
Living people
Sportspeople from Maribor
Slovenian male badminton players
21st-century Slovenian people